Allan Jensen may refer to:

 Al Jensen (born 1958), former Canadian ice hockey goaltender
 Allan Jensen (footballer) (1922–2003), Australian rules footballer
 Allan Ravn Jensen (born 1974), Danish former footballer